Delias fruhstorferi is a butterfly in the family Pieridae. It was described by Eduard Honrath in 1892. It is found in the Indomalayan realm, where it has only been recorded from Java.

Subspecies
Delias fruhstorferi fruhstorferi (eastern Java)
Delias fruhstorferi takakoae Sakuma & Morita, 1995 (Mt. Wilis, eastern Java)

Etymology
The name honours Hans Fruhstorfer.

References

External links
Delias at Markku Savela's Lepidoptera and Some Other Life Forms

fruhstorferi
Butterflies described in 1892